Civic nationalism, also known as democratic nationalism and liberal nationalism, is a form of nationalism that adheres to traditional liberal values of freedom, tolerance, equality, individual rights and is not based on ethnocentrism. Civic nationalists often defend the value of national identity by saying that individuals need it as an upper identity in order to lead meaningful, autonomous lives and that democratic polities need national identity to function properly. 

Civic nationalism is frequently contrasted with ethnic nationalism. Historically, civic nationalism was a determining factor in the development of modern constitutional and democratic forms of government, whereas ethnic nationalism has been more associated with authoritarian rule and even dictatorship.

Civic nationhood is a political identity built around shared citizenship within the state. Thus, a "civic nation" is defined not by culture but by political institutions and liberal principles, which its citizens pledge to uphold. Membership in the civic nation is open to every citizen by citizenship, regardless of culture or ethnicity; those who share these values are considered members of the nation. For example, according to the Article 66 of the Turkish Constitution, those who receive Turkish citizenship are considered as a "Turk" even if their ethnicity is not Turkish.

In theory, a civic nation or state does not aim to promote one culture over another. German philosopher Jürgen Habermas argued that immigrants to a liberal-democratic state need not assimilate into the host culture but only accept the principles of the country's constitution (constitutional patriotism).

History

Civic nationalism lies within the traditions of rationalism and liberalism, but as a form of nationalism it is contrasted with ethnic nationalism. Ernest Renan is often thought to be an early civic nationalist. Philosopher Hans Kohn was one of the first to differentiate civic nationalism from ethnic nationalism in his 1944 publication The Idea of Nationalism: A Study in Its Origins and Background. Membership of the civic nation is considered voluntary, as in  Renan's classical definition in "Qu'est-ce qu'une nation?" of the nation as a "daily referendum" characterized by the "will to live together". Civic-national ideals influenced the development of representative democracy in countries such as the United States and France (see the United States Declaration of Independence of 1776, and the Declaration of the Rights of Man and of the Citizen of 1789).

The Corsican nationalist movement organized around the FLNC is giving a civic definition of the Corsican nation ("destiny community") in the continuity of Pasquale Paoli and the ideas of the Lumières.

The Scottish National Party and Plaid Cymru, which advocate independence of their respective nations from the United Kingdom, proclaim themselves to be civic nationalist parties, in which they advocate the independence and popular sovereignty of the people living in their nation's society, not individual ethnic groups.

The Republican Left of Catalonia supports a civic Catalan independentism and defends a Catalan Republic based on republicanism and civic values within a diverse society.

The Union of Cypriots define its ideology as Cypriot nationalism, a civic nationalism that focuses on the shared identity of Greek Cypriots and Turkish Cypriots. It highlights both communities' common culture, heritage and traditions as well as economic, political, and social rights. It also supports the reunification of Cyprus and the end of foreign interference by Greece, Turkey, and the United Kingdom.

Outside Europe, it has also been used to describe the Republican Party in the United States during the Civil War Era.

Civic nationalism shares elements of the Swiss concept of Willensnation, which is German for "nation by will", coined by Carl Hilty, understood as shared experience and dedication by citizens.

Critique
The main criticism to civic nationalism comes from ethnic nationalism, which considers that the former was invented solely to act against the latter.

Yael Tamir has argued that the differences between ethnic and civic nationalism are blurred.

See also
 National liberalism
 Americanism (ideology)
 Civic virtue
 Composite nationalism
 Cultural nationalism
 Imagined community
 Liberal Nationalism (book)
 Nation-building
 Postcolonial anarchism
 Plurinationalism

Citations

Sources

External links 
 

 
Anti-racism
Communitarianism
Cosmopolitanism
Cultural politics
Immigration activism
Liberalism
National liberalism
Pluralism (philosophy)
Political philosophy
Political science terminology
Rationalism
Social ideologies

de:Willensnation